Sékou Amadou Camara (born 23 September 1997) is a Guinean footballer who plays as a striker for Difaâ El Jadidi in the Botola.

International career

International goals
Scores and results list Guinea's goal tally first.

References

Association football forwards
1997 births
Living people
Guinean footballers
Difaâ Hassani El Jadidi players
Guinea international footballers
Guinean expatriate footballers
Expatriate footballers in Morocco
Expatriate footballers in Belgium
Guinea A' international footballers
Guinean expatriate sportspeople in Belgium
Guinean expatriate sportspeople in Switzerland
Guinean expatriate sportspeople in Morocco
Expatriate footballers in Switzerland
FC Wil players
Royale Union Saint-Gilloise players
S.C. Eendracht Aalst players
2018 African Nations Championship players